David Wardle is Professor of Classics, as well as Acting Dean in the Faculty of Humanities, at the University of Cape Town.

Academic career 

Born 23 December 1959 and educated in Nottingham, UK, Wardle took an MA and a DPhil from Oxford University in the sub-faculty of Literae Humaniores. After a brief stint working for the United Kingdom Atomic Energy Authority, he came to UCT as a lecturer in August 1990 and was appointed Professor in Classics and Ancient History in 2006.

Wardle's academic specialisation lies in the field of Roman imperial history and historiography which he combines with an interest in ancient Roman religion.

Besides numerous articles and book reviews, Wardle is the author of four monographs, which have taken the form of commentaries on key texts from the Classical period: Suetonius’ Life of Caligula (Brussels, 1994), Valerius Maximus’ Memorable Deeds and Sayings (Oxford, 1998) and Cicero’s On Divination (Oxford, 2006), and Suetonius: Life of Augustus (Oxford, 2014).

Wardle is also a former editor of the Classics journal, Acta Classica.

In 2017, Wardle was appointed Acting Dean of the Faculty of Humanities, at the University of Cape Town.

References

External links 
 University of Cape Town Biography

Academic staff of the University of Cape Town
South African classical scholars
Alumni of Oriel College, Oxford
Living people
1959 births